The ancestral Arctic fox Vulpes qiuzhudingi is an extinct species of fox found in the Himalayas. It was primarily carnivorous.  The fossils, dating from between 5.08 and 3.60 million years ago, were found in the Zanda Basin and Kunlun Mountains of Tibet.  It was named after Qiu Zhuding, a paleontologist from the Chinese Academy of Sciences.  The species is believed to be the ancestor of Vulpes lagopus, the modern Arctic fox, which would support the "Out of Tibet" theory: namely, that a number of current arctic species trace their ancestry to species originally from the Tibetan Plateau.

References

Fauna of the Himalayas
Vulpes
Pliocene mammals of Asia
Prehistoric canines
Fossil taxa described in 2014